The Men's Single Sculls took place at the Lagoa Rodrigo de Freitas. The heats and repechages happened on July 14 and the Finals on July 17.

Medals

Heats

Heat 1

Heat 2

Repechages

Repechage 1

Repechage 2

Finals

Final B

Final A

Rowing at the 2007 Pan American Games